Marshall-Harris-Richardson House is a historic home located at Raleigh, Wake County, North Carolina.  It was built about 1900, and is a two-story, asymmetrical, Queen Anne-style frame dwelling.  It has a one-story, hip roofed front porch.  It features a steeply-pitched truncated hipped roof with projecting gables.  It was moved to its present location in the fall of 1985.

It was listed on the National Register of Historic Places in 1986.

References

Houses on the National Register of Historic Places in North Carolina
Queen Anne architecture in North Carolina
Houses completed in 1900
Houses in Raleigh, North Carolina
National Register of Historic Places in Raleigh, North Carolina